Sitka, Alaska is a unified city-borough in the southeast portion of the U.S. state of Alaska.

Sitka may also refer to:

Places 
Sitka, Indiana
Sitka, Kansas
Sitka Township, Clark County, Kansas
Sitka, Kentucky
Sitka, Ohio

Other uses
Sitka Tribe of Alaska, a federally-recognized tribal government
Sitka High School
Sitka School District
Sitka (crater), a crater on Mars
USS Sitka (PF-94), a patrol frigate renamed USS Milledgeville in 1944 while under construction
USS Sitka (APA-113), an attack transport in commission from 1945 to 1946
Battle of Sitka, a 1804 battle between Russians and Alaska Natives
 Sitka, a font family used in Microsoft Windows

People with the surname
 Emil Sitka (1915–1998), American actor

See also 
 Sitka deer (Odocoileus hemionus sitkensis)
 Sitka spruce (Picea sitchensis)
 USS Sitka, a list of U.S. ships